Hot Wheels: World Race is a 2003 computer-animated sports action film based on the Hot Wheels television series Hot Wheels: Highway 35 – World Race that premiered on Cartoon Network from July 12 to August 2, 2003 which includes five episodes, "Ring of Fire", "The Greatest Challenge", "Desert Heat", "Frozen Fire" and "Wheel of Power" divided into a feature film. The film was distributed on DVD by Family Home Entertainment and Artisan Entertainment. The video game Hot Wheels: World Race was based on the television series. It was released on VHS and DVD on December 2, 2003, and was followed by a sequel, titled Hot Wheels: AcceleRacers (2005).

Plot
Vert Wheeler is a 16 year old lone skateboarder/surfboarder who just got his driver's license. A life sized Hot Wheels car appears in his driveway with Dr. Peter Tezla telling him that he's looking for the fastest driver in the world.

Meeting up with several other drivers in a disclosed location, Vert tests out his new car, which has rocket boosts on the bottom. He draws the ire of two racers, Taro Kitano and Kurt Wylde, the former of which berates him for thinking it's a game.

Soon, the race begins, and after every car goes 300 miles per hour, a portal to another dimension opens. The dimension is basically a large volcano, ready to burst. With a little help from a mysterious driver, it does. Vert is able to use his surfing skills to ride a volcano wave, but his teammate, Lani Tam, has trouble getting through the lava, causing Taro to go back and get her. Vert soon comes back to help Taro, giving out the idea that Lani, who is trapped on a rock that's about to fall, grabs onto a grappling hook. He earns Taro's respect, while Kurt Wylde finishes first in what is now considered the first leg of the race.

The racers are split into 5 teams, led by Banjee Castillo, Brian Kadeem, Kitano, Wylde, and Wheeler. Wheeler recruits his skateboarding friend, Alec Wood, and Kurt's brother, Mark, after the latter rejects him.

Cast 
 Andrew Francis as Josef "Vert" Wheeler
 Brian Drummond as Kurt Wylde
 Kevan Ohtsji as Taro Kitano
 Will Sanderson as Mark Wylde
 Venus Terzo as Lani Tam
 Michael Benyaer as Banjee Castillo
 Kaj Erik Eriksen as Skeet
 Cusse Mankuma as Brian Kadeem
 Blu Mankuma as Hasis
 Kirby Morrow as Chuvo
 Scott McNeil as Rekkas
 Kathleen Barr as Gelorum
 Michael Donovan as Dr. Peter Tezla
 John Payne as Major Jack Wheeler, Jr.

See also
 Hot Wheels: World Race (video game)

Hot Wheels shows:
 Hot Wheels (1969–1971)
 Heroes on Hot Wheels (1991–1992)
 Hot Wheels: World Race (2003)
 Hot Wheels: AcceleRacers (2005–2006)
 Hot Wheels Battle Force 5 (2009–2011)
 Team Hot Wheels (2014-2017)

References

External links
 

2000s American animated films
2000s English-language films
2000s children's animated films
2003 computer-animated films
2003 direct-to-video films
2003 films
American auto racing films
American children's animated adventure films
American children's animated fantasy films
American direct-to-video films
Animated films about auto racing
Artisan Entertainment films
Canadian animated feature films
Canadian auto racing films
Canadian children's animated films
Canadian direct-to-video films
Canadian fantasy films
Direct-to-video animated films
English-language Canadian films
Fictional racing drivers
Films about parallel universes
Films based on Mattel toys
Hot Wheels
Rainmaker Studios films
2000s Canadian films